Brett Alex Pesce (born November 15, 1994) is an American professional ice hockey defenseman currently playing for the Carolina Hurricanes of the National Hockey League (NHL). He was drafted 66th overall by the Hurricanes in the 2013 NHL Entry Draft.

Playing career
Pesce attended Irvington High School in New York, and played varsity on a joint Irvington-Sleepy Hollow hockey team, graduating in June 2012. He also played his amateur youth hockey within New Jersey, eventually playing with the New Jersey Hitmen of the Eastern Junior Hockey League. He committed to play collegiate hockey with the University of New Hampshire of the Hockey East. After his freshman season with the Wildcats, Pesce was selected by the Hurricanes as a third round selection in the 2013 NHL Entry Draft. In his sophomore season in 2013–14, Pesce set a personal best 7 goals and 21 points in 41 games with New Hampshire. In his junior season, Pesce ranked second amongst Wildcats on the blueline in scoring with 16 points in 31 games.

Having played 109 games with the Wildcats, Pesce opted to forgo his final year of eligibility signing a three-year entry-level contract with the Carolina Hurricanes on March 27, 2015. He was signed to an amateur try-out contract with the Hurricanes AHL affiliate, the Charlotte Checkers, and made his professional debut on April 2, 2015, against the Oklahoma City Barons. He appeared in the Checkers final four homes games to conclude the 2014–15 regular season.

After attending the Hurricanes 2015 training camp, Pesce was re-assigned to begin his rookie 2015–16 season with the Checkers. On October 14, 2015, Pesce received his first NHL recall by Carolina and was a healthy scratch. Pesce was returned to the Checkers, however during his second recall to the Hurricanes made his NHL debut in a 5–2 defeat against the San Jose Sharks on October 24, 2015. On November 22, 2015, he scored his first NHL goal, and had an assist, to get the Hurricanes a 4–3 win over the Los Angeles Kings.

In the 2019–20 season, Pesce was used in a top-four role with the Hurricanes, posting 4 goals and 18 points in 61 games from the blueline. On February 22, 2020, Pesce suffered a right shoulder injury against the Toronto Maple Leafs. He was later ruled out for the remainder of the campaign undergoing season-ending surgery.

Career statistics

Regular season and playoffs

International

References

External links
 

1994 births
American men's ice hockey defensemen
Carolina Hurricanes draft picks
Carolina Hurricanes players
Charlotte Checkers (2010–) players
Ice hockey players from New York (state)
Living people
New Hampshire Wildcats men's ice hockey players
People from Irvington, New York
USA Hockey National Team Development Program players